Redtenbacheria is a genus of flies in the family Tachinidae.

Species
Redtenbacheria insignis Egger, 1861

References

Dexiinae
Diptera of Europe
Diptera of Asia
Tachinidae genera
Taxa named by Ignaz Rudolph Schiner